Tsvetelina Nikolova (born ) is a Bulgarian female volleyball player. She is part of the Bulgaria women's national volleyball team.

She competed at the 2009 Women's European Volleyball Championship.
She participated in the 2014 FIVB Volleyball World Grand Prix.
On club level she played for VC Vandoeuvre in 2014.

References

External links
 Profile at FIVB.org

1990 births
Living people
Bulgarian women's volleyball players
Place of birth missing (living people)